Yoo Je-won  is a South Korean television director best known for his television dramas series High School King of Savvy (2014), Oh My Ghost (2015), Abyss (2019) and Hi Bye, Mama! (2020). Also with his most recent Netflix hit simulcast original series Hometown Cha-Cha-Cha (2021) and Crash Course in Romance (2023).

Career

Early careers 
“Yoo started his career as drama crew for broadcasting station SBS. In 2007 Yoo worked as assistant director for director  for a 20 episodes drama series written by Park Eon-hee, . In the same year, Yoo worked again with director  and writer Park Eon-hee in SBS drama . This 19 episodes drama aired every Friday in SBS drama from August 24 to October 26, 2007.

In 2008, Yoo worked as assistant for director  weekend drama . Written by Kim Jung-soo, the drama was aired in SBS from February 10 to August 31, 2008. This 63 episodes family drama aired in SBS from March 20, 2010, to November 7, 2010, every Saturday and Sunday.

2014–2020: Career as director 
High School King of Savvy was Yoo's first drama series as director. Starring Seo In-guk, Lee Ha-na, Lee Soo-hyuk and Lee Yul-eum, it was broadcast on tvN from June 16 to August 11, 2014. Due to the drama popularity, an episode was added so it became 17 episodes, and a special broadcast with behind-the-scenes stories was broadcast on August 12, 2014. It was followed by 25 episodes makjang weekend drama Tears of Heaven (2014). Starring Park Ji-young, Hong Ah-reum, Seo Jun-young and Yoon Seo. It was aired in MBN from October 11, 2014, to January 3, 2015. The drama recorded the highest viewership rating (3.305%) for MBN drama at that time, and the record was stayed unbroken until 2019.

In 2015, Yoo and  met again in fantasy drama Oh My Ghost. The drama was highly anticipated because it was Park Bo-young's first television series in seven years, starred alongside Jo Jung-suk, Lim Ju-hwan and Kim Seul-gi. The drama portrays the love story between Na Bong-sun, an assistant chef who has ability to see ghost who has one side love with her boss, arrogant star chef Kang Sun-woo. Na Bong-sun one day possessed by a virgin spirit who completely changes her timid personality. The 16 episodes drama series aired on tvN from July 3 to August 22, 2015. The series was a commercial and critical hit. Its 7% rating was the highest for cable television drama at the time. Park Bo-young earned Excellence Award, Actress in a Miniseries at the 4th APAN Star Awards for her role.

After two years Yoo was back with a time-travel themed fantasy drama series Tomorrow, With You. Starring Shin Min-a and Lee Je-hoon, it was started airing on February 3, 2017, on cable channel tvN. This series was not as successful as Yoo previous television series. Yoo then worked as assistant ditector of tvN drama Stranger.

In 2018, Yoo reunited with Seo In-guk for a South Korean remake of the 2002 Japanese television series Sora Kara Furu Ichioku no Hoshi. The adapted Korean version english title is The Smile Has Left Your Eyes. Jung So-min and Park Sung-woong joined this project. It was first aired on tvN on October 3, 2018.

In 2019, Yoo reunited with Park Bo-young in tvN drama Abyss, with Ahn Hyo-seop and Lee Sung-jae joined as her costars. Theme of the drama was about a man and a woman who have been resurrected from death with different faces with the mysterious soul-reviving bead called Abyss.

In 2020, Yoo work with writer Kwon In-woo in a fantasy melodrama Hi Bye, Mama! The drama was highly anticipated as Kim Tae-hee's comeback drama after five years, joined by rising stars Lee Kyu-hyung and Go Bo-gyeol. Drama's storyline depicts the 49-day real reincarnation story of a ghost mother who reappears in front of her husband and daughter who already started a new life after overcoming the pain of bereavement. It was aired on tvN from February 22 to April 19, 2020.

2021–present: Breakthrough, mainstream success 
In April 2021, Studio Dragon announced that Yoo will be reunited with Shin Min-a, as director of Seaside Village Cha-Cha-Cha, a remake of 2004 South Korean film Mr. Handy, Mr. Hong. It was first announced on December 21, 2020, under the working title of Hong Ban-jang with Shin Min-a and Kim Seon-ho being offered the lead roles. In June, it was announced that the series english title is Hometown Cha-Cha-Cha and it will be available for streaming on Netflix. This is a healing romance drama about a realist dentist Yoon Hye-jin (Shin Min-a) and an all-rounder, Hong Banjang (Kim Seon-ho), a sea village called Gongjin. A genius variety producer Ji PD (Lee Sang-yi) then select Gongjin as setting for his new variety show. This 16 episodes drama were aired from August 28 to October 17, 2021, on tvN's Saturdays and Sundays at 21:00 (KST) time slot.

Branded as healing drama, Hometown Cha-Cha-Cha received favorable reviews from domestic and foreign viewers. It became one of the highest-rated series on cable television history. It ranked first place during its entire run for eight weeks, and the last episode achieved 12.665% nationwide rating, with over 3.2 million views. Hometown Cha-Cha-Cha also one of 2021 most-watched non-English television on Netflix. According to FlixPatrol, the series placed number 8 on Netflix global chart. Netflix's one of its longest-running hits as it spent 16 weeks in global top ten ranking in more than 20 countries. It also remained on Netflix's Top 10 Chart for television shows for more than two months from its last episode.

On December 21, 2020, Kim Soo-hyun Drama Art Hall operated by Cheongju City Culture Industry Promotion Foundation, selected Hometown Cha-Cha-Cha as '2021 Good Drama of the Year'. Yoo as director and Shin Ha-eun as writer are also recognized in the certificate of award. It was selected by both the viewer evaluation team and expert group and it was praised as a 'K-healing drama' that appeared at a time when sensational genre content was overflowing, and was loved by domestic and foreign viewers. 

The series, starring Jeon Do-yeon and Jung Kyung-ho, revolved around a former national handball player who now runs a banchan shop, raising her high school daughter alone and celebrity math instructor at a popular private academy.

Personal life 
Yoo has been married to Lee Shi-ra since 2009.

Since they met in drama Oh My Ghost, Yoo was given the nickname Yoovely by Park Bo-young, a portmanteau of his surname and the English word "lovely."

Filmography

As assistant director in television series

As director in television series

Casting 
Yoo frequently re-casts actors whom he has worked with on previous dramas.

Awards and nominations

Notes

References

External links 
 
 

South Korean television directors
Living people
Year of birth missing (living people)